Goodnews Bay is a city in Bethel Census Area, Alaska, United States. As of the 2010 census, the population of the city was 243, up from 230 in 2000.

Geography
Goodnews Bay is located on the north shore of Goodnews Bay at the mouth of the Goodnews River, at  (59.121408, -161.585835).

History

Goodnews Bay first reported on the 1880 U.S. Census as the unincorporated Inuit village of "Mumtrahamute" with 162 residents (all Inuit). It reported on the 1890 census as "Mumtrahamiut", again returning with an unchanged 162 residents. It next reported in 1920 as "Mumtrakmut." In 1926, platinum was discovered in the region around Goodnews Bay and was mined by the Goodnews Bay Mining Company until 1979. It next reported in 1940 as "Good News Bay." It returned in 1950 as "Mumtrak." From 1960-70, it also returned as Mumtrak with the alternative name of Goodnews Bay. It formally incorporated in 1970 as Goodnews Bay, and has returned as such since 1980.

Demographics 
As of the census of 2000, there were 230 people, 71 households, and 47 families residing in the city. The racial makeup of the city was 5.65% White, 92.61% Native American, and 1.74% from two or more races.

There were 71 households, out of which 45.1% had children under the age of 18 living with them, 31.0% were married couples living together, 23.9% had a female householder with no husband present, and 32.4% were non-families. 32.4% of all households were made up of individuals, and 4.2% had someone living alone who was 65 years of age or older.  The average household size was 3.24 and the average family size was 4.04.

In the city, the age distribution of the population shows 36.1% under the age of 18, 10.4% from 18 to 24, 28.3% from 25 to 44, 17.4% from 45 to 64, and 7.8% who were 65 years of age or older.  The median age was 31 years. For every 100 females, there were 105.4 males.  For every 100 females age 18 and over, there were 122.7 males.

The median income for a household in the city was $16,250, and the median income for a family was $21,563. Males had a median income of $31,250 versus $0 for females. The per capita income for the city was $6,851.  About 37.8% of families and 39.0% of the population were below the poverty line, including 53.3% of those under the age of eighteen and none of those 65 or over.

Education
Lower Kuskokwim School District operates the Rocky Mountain School, a PreK-12 school.  it has 70 students.

References

External links
 Alaska Community Database Community Information Summaries

Cities in Alaska
Cities in Bethel Census Area, Alaska
Mining communities in Alaska
Populated coastal places in Alaska on the Pacific Ocean